Days Like This may refer to:

 Days Like This (Van Morrison album), 1995
 "Days Like This" (Van Morrison song), 1995
 "Days Like This" (Rachel Proctor song), 2003
  "Days Like This", a song by Sheena Easton on The Lover In Me (album), 1989 
 Days Like This (Krezip album), 2002
 Days Like This (Radio Ulster), a radio programme broadcast on BBC Radio Ulster
 Days Like This (film), a 2001 film directed by Mikael Håfström